The year 776 BC is largely known for being the first year of the Attic calendar, also known as the Ancient Greek calendar or the Olympiad era.

Events
July – The first recorded Olympic Games are held in Olympia, Greece.

Births

References

770s BC